Micajah Heights is a neighborhood in Plymouth, Massachusetts, United States, in the West Plymouth section of the town, southwest of Billington Sea. The neighborhood surrounds Micajah Pond.

See also
 Neighborhoods in Plymouth, Massachusetts

Neighborhoods in Plymouth, Massachusetts
Villages in Massachusetts